David Fraisse (born Saint-Vallier, on 20 December 1966), also known by the nickname of "Frezzy", is a French rugby union coach and former rugby league footballer who played in the 1980s and 1990s. He played representative rugby league for France at the 1995 Rugby League World Cup.

Playing career
Fraisse first played for France in 1987. In 1993–94 Fraisse spent the season with the Sheffield Eagles. He then spent a season at Bradford Northern, before joining Workington Town. His twenty-first and last international match was at the 1995 World Cup.

Coaching career
Fraisse is currently coaching the defence for RC Toulonnais.

References

1968 births
Living people
Sportspeople from Drôme
AS Carcassonne players
Bradford Bulls players
France national rugby league team players
French rugby league players
French rugby union coaches
RC Carpentras XIII players
RC Toulonnais coaches
Rugby league centres
Rugby league five-eighths
Rugby league fullbacks
Rugby league wingers
Sheffield Eagles (1984) players
Workington Town players